The Agricultural Sector Alliance of the Philippines, Inc. (AGAP) is a party-list in the Philippines. The organization was established in 2003 in order to protect and promote the welfare of farmers. Since then, it has been actively pursuing all endeavors that would benefit the entire agricultural industry nationwide.

In the 14 May 2007 election, the party won 2 seats in the nationwide party-list vote. In the 2010, AGAP one 1 seat, down from 2, while in the next election, they regained a seat with 592,463 (2.14% of the popular vote), the most successful election AGAP has had so far. Their incumbent representative is Rep. Rico Geron, but Nicanor Briones is their president and he previously served as AGAP's three-term representative.

AGAP is actively coordinating with different government agencies such as the Department of Agriculture, Department of Finance, Bureau of Customs, Tariff Commission, Presidential Anti-smuggling Task Force and the Office of President on issues that are affecting the agricultural industry.

Electoral performance

Legislative Affairs
During the 14th Congress (2007-2010), AGAP party list, through Rep. Nicanor Briones and Rep. Caesar Cobrador, was among those who pushed for the enactment of the following laws:

 RA 9496 - An act that extended the utilization period of the Agricultural Competitiveness Enhancement Fund up to 2015
 RA 9250 - Cooperative Code of the Philippines
 RA 9513 - Renewable Energy Act of 2008
 Agri-Agra Reform Credit Act of 2009 (RA 10000), a law that mandates banks to allot 25% credit resources for farmers.
 Organic Agriculture Act of 2010 (RA 10068), a pro-environment law to enrich the soil and reduce pollution.

         In the Fifteenth Congress (2010-2013), AGAP party list, through Rep. Nicanor Briones, helped passing the following legislations:

 RA 10601 - Agriculture And Fisheries Mechanization Law 
 RA 10593 - Amendment to the Coconut Preservation Act
 RA 10536 - Amendment To The Meat Inspection Code of the Philippines

         Through the 16th Congress (2013-2016), AGAP party list, through Rep. Nicanor Briones and Rep. Rico Geron, did the following:

 Sought to extend the agriculture competitiveness enhancement fund where the government would give grants rather than credits to farmers
 Co-authored a legislation where the employment contracts of Overseas Filipino Workers (OFW's) would be translated to their local dialects
 Filed a bill where the tax exemption of balikbayan boxes would be raised to $2,000 from $500
 Co-authored a bill that seeks to modernize the Customs in order to address smuggling
 Called for an investigation on the alleged smuggled prime cut meats, and
 Co-authored a bill that sought to protect farmers from the losses and unfair competition brought by illegal importation.

         In the 17th Congress (2016-2019), AGAP party list, through Rep. Rico Geron, did the following:

 Co-authored a bill that pushed for assistance to farmers, who are beneficiaries of agrarian reform as well as those belonging to indigenous cultural communities through free irrigation services
 Joined efforts with other legislators to push for legislation granting an extension for the grant of incentives to Tourism Enterprise Zones (TEZs) and registered tourism enterprises
 Approved a bill, through the chairmanship of House Committee on Cooperatives Development, that sought to provide for mandatory appointment of cooperative officers in every province, municipality, and city
 Pushed for a bill that creates a Rice Fund, where rice farmers and their dependents would benefit from
 Together with other lawmakers, pushed for the reorganization and strengthen the Cooperative Development Authority.

         In the 18th Congress (2019-2022), there are at least fifty-eight (58) proposed measures authored or supported by Rep. Rico Geron, the current AGAP party list representative. Among these measures are the following:

 HB No. 3170 - creation of the Farmer's Bank of the Philippines
 HB 3171 - establishment of farmers' registration and preservation of their rights
 RA11463 (former HB 5477) - establishment of Malasakit Program and institutionalizing the delivery of medical and financial assistance under Malasakit Centers in public hospitals
 HB 6815 - providing an accelerated recovery and investments stimulus for the Philippine economy
 HB 6864 - establishment of public health and environmental standards and safeguards for the better normal in the workplace, public places, and communities toward a sustainable recovery from the COVID-19 pandemic
 HB 6920 - establishment of a COVID-19 unemployment reduction economic stimulus fund
 HB 8385 - promotion of integrated urban agriculture in urban areas nationwide to address food security
  HB 9147 - regulating the production, importation, sale, distribution, provision, use, recovery, collection, recycling, and disposal of single-use plastic products
 HB 9178 - further promotion of entrepreneurship by strengthening, empowering, and enhancing the financing and other support programs for micro, small, and medium enterprises, amending the Magna Carta for MSMEs
 HB 9205 - establishing the Agriculture Information System in all cities and municipalities
 HB 9560 - providing for the modernization of the public health emergency preparedness and response capabilities, establishing the Center For Disease And Prevention Control.

Other Involvements
AGAP President Nicanor Briones has been working with different sectors in protecting farmers’ livelihood and economic welfare by fighting against excessive importation of pork that would affect the income of local pork producers and sellers, unfair reduction of tariff rates for imported pork, and technical smuggling. He has been calling for the establishment of several meat inspection laboratories to prevent the spread of African Swine Fever (ASF) as well as indemnification for local pork producers affected by ASF.

References

Party-lists represented in the House of Representatives of the Philippines
Agrarian parties in the Philippines